Baroness Morris may refer to:

Patricia Morris, Baroness Morris of Bolton (b. 1954), British peer & Shadow Minister for Children, Schools and Families for the Conservatives
Estelle Morris, Baroness Morris of Yardley (b. 1952), British Labour politician and member of the House of Lords